A tour de force is a performance or achievement that has been accomplished or managed with great skill, strength or ingenuity.

It may also refer to:
 Tour de Force (film), a 2014 German drama film directed by Christian Zübert 
 Tour de Force (novel), a 1955 novel by Christianna Brand
 Tour De Force (tour), 1986 Elton John concert tour
 Tour de Force (Sonny Rollins album), 1956
 Tour de Force (Bola Sete album), 1963
 Tour de Force (38 Special album), 1984
 Tour de Force (Nick Brignola album), 2002
 Tour De Force – Live, a 1982 live album by jazz guitarist Al Di Meola
 "Tour de Force", a 1999 song by Covenant on  their 2000 album United States of Mind
 Tour De Force, 2018 Ninja Sex Party concert tour